Triumph & Tragedy is Grade's first release on Victory Records. "Panama" is a cover of a Van Halen song. This EP was included in its entirety on The Embarrassing Beginning.

Track listing
 "Triumph & Tragedy"
 "Stolen Bikes Ride Faster"
 "Panama"

References
 

1999 EPs
Victory Records EPs
Grade (band) albums